Alexander Anderson (30 April 1845 – 11 July 1909) was a Scottish poet.

Biography 
Born in Kirkconnel, Dumfries and Galloway, Scotland, the sixth and youngest son of James Anderson a quarrier. When he was three, the household moved to Crocketford in Kirkcudbrightshire. He attended the local school where the teacher found him to be of average ability. The area around Crocketford was renowned for martyrdom and Anderson seems to have taken inspiration from his walks in the hills in his later poetry. At 16 he was back in his native village working in a quarry; some two years later (1862), he became a surfaceman or platelayer on the Glasgow and South-Western Railway, and generally wrote under the name of Surfaceman.

Spending all his leisure in self-culture, he mastered German, French, and Spanish sufficiently to read the chief masterpieces in these languages. Anderson was published in periodicals such as Good Words and Chambers's Edinburgh Journal numerous times from 1871 until 1890. His poetic vein, which was true if somewhat limited in range, soon manifested itself, and in 1870 he began to send verses to the ‘People's Friend’ of Dundee, and subsequently his first book ‘A Song of Labour and other Poems’, was published in 1873 by the Dundee Advertiser in a run of 1000. Thanks to the support of The People's Friend this issue sold out within a fortnight. He was also aided by the support of the Rev George Gilfillan, a poetry critic in Dundee. Gilfillan wrote to Thomas Aird "You will be greatly interested in his simple manner and appearance-an unspoiled Burns is these respects and not without a little real . Of course you know his poetry and his remarkable history". and there followed Two Angels (1875), Songs of the Rail (1878), and Ballads and Sonnets (1879). In the following year he was made assistant librarian in the University of Edinburgh, and after an interval as secretary to the Philosophical Institution there, he returned as Chief Librarian to the University. Thereafter he wrote little. Of a simple and gentle character, he made many friends, including the Duke of Argyll, Thomas Carlyle, and Lord Houghton.

A famous poem of his is "Cuddle Doon".

Anderson died on 11 July 1909 in Edinburgh.

Works 

 A Song of Labour, and other poems 1873. Dundee
 The Two Angels, and other poems With an introductory sketch by Rev. G. Gilfillan. 1875. London
 Songs of the Rail 1878. London
 Ballads and Sonnets. 1879. London
 Later Poems of Alexander Anderson, “Surfaceman.” Edited, with a biographical sketch, by Alexander Brown. 1912.

References 

 Cuthbertson, David. The Life-History of Alexander Anderson-“Surfaceman”. 1929. Inveresk. 139pp
 Brown, Alexander. Later Poems of Alexander Anderson, “Surfaceman.” Edited, with a biographical sketch, by Alexander Brown. 1912.
 Edwards, D. H. One Hundred Modern Scottish Poets 1880 Pages 157–168.
 Miller, Frank. Poets of Dumfriesshire 1910. Pages 294–300.
 Wilson, James Grant. Poets and Poetry of Scotland. Volume 2 1876 Pages 501–506.
 Murdoch, Alexander G. Recent and Living Scottish Poets 1883 Pages 401–406.
 Watt, Julia Muir  Dumfries and Galloway: A Literary Guide 2000. Pages 168–171.

External links

Alexander Anderson: 'Poet of the Iron Horse and Cottage Home' biography & selected writings at gerald-massey.org.uk
Video and commentary on Alexander Anderson

People from Dumfries and Galloway
Scottish librarians
Scottish male poets
Scottish scholars and academics
People associated with the University of Edinburgh
1845 births
1909 deaths
19th-century Scottish poets
19th-century British male writers
19th-century British writers
Poets associated with Dundee